Idoru is the second book in William Gibson's Bridge trilogy. Idoru is a science-fiction novel set in a postmodern, dystopian, cyberpunk future. One of the main characters, Colin Laney, has a talent for identifying nodal points, analogous to Gibson's own:

Plot summary
In the post Tokyo/San Francisco earthquake world of the early 21st century, Colin Laney is referred to agents of mega-rock star Rez (of the musical group Lo/Rez) for a job using his peculiar talent of sifting through vast amounts of mundane data to find "nodal points" of particular relevance.  Rez has claimed to want to marry a synthetic personality named Rei Toei, the Idoru (Japanese Idol) of the title, a claim stranger than usual and therefore questioned by his loyal staff, particularly by his head of security, Keith Blackwell.  Blackwell believes that someone is manipulating Rez, and wants Laney to find out who.  Simultaneously, the Seattle chapter of the Lo/Rez fan club is discussing exactly the same topic of the unbelievable marriage of human and AI construct.  Fourteen-year-old Chia Pet McKenzie is chosen by the group to go to Tokyo and meet with the Tokyo chapter to find out what is really happening.  On the flight she meets a woman named Maryalice, who dupes her into unwittingly carrying a contraband item through customs in Tokyo.

Laney accepts his new position warily, but is conflicted throughout much of the novel by his past involvement with a powerful infotainment organization, "SlitScan", which thrives on destroying media personalities by exposing their secrets.  In the course of this earlier job he feels responsible for the death of an innocent party.  His talent had allowed him a foreshadowing of a probable suicide but SlitScan had tried to limit Laney's role to passive observer.  However, Laney's conscience snapped and he attempted at the last moment to stop the suicide, but instead became mired in a scandal.  Yet another organization claiming to be a media watchdog steps in and tries to pull Laney away from SlitScan to use his story to expose SlitScan’s involvement in illegal spying.  This goes awry and Laney is left high and dry and alone.  Further complicating Laney’s life is that Kathy Torrance, his controller from SlitScan, is attempting to blackmail him with false evidence into betraying his current employers, Lo/Rez, by exposing whatever secret she thinks they are hiding.

Chia, after being brought to the club run by Maryalice’s boyfriend Eddie, is helped to escape by one of the club’s employees who perceives that she is in danger.  She takes with her the contraband which was slipped into her luggage.  When she meets with the local Tokyo chapter of the Lo/Rez fan club she is disappointed by their seeming indifference to the impending "wedding" and they inform her this is merely an unfounded rumor.  Disbelieving, Chia decides to investigate on her own and seeks the help of her host Mitsuko’s brother Masahiko, an otaku who is a member of the hacker community the "Walled City" (a virtual community based on Kowloon Walled City).  Masahiko and Chia embark on a search for the truth to the marriage of Rez and Rei by going to the club where Rez announced the event, though the club no longer exists in the rapidly changing Tokyo scene.  Masahiko is informed by other denizens of Walled City that he is being watched, both on the net and physically at his (and his sister’s) home.  Chia admits to Masahiko that she has found something in her luggage and that might be what the unknown men are seeking.  The contraband turns out to be a highly illegal nanotech assembler, a device used for high-speed material fabrication, which Eddie smuggled in on behalf of the Kombinat.  Chia and Masahiko go to a love hotel to try to hide from the searchers.  It is here that all the parties converge.  When Chia and Masahiko link into the net, the Idoru (Rei) manifests herself in Chia's Venice simulation after she realizes that Chia is playing a part in her evolution.  Maryalice finds the hotel through their taxi record, letting herself into their room. Lamenting her recent breakup with Eddie over the botched smuggling operation, she tells them that giving back the device won’t stop them from being killed as witnesses.

Masahiko and Chia go onto the Net to get the help of Chia’s friend Zona Rosa, who claims to be the leader of a Mexico City "girl gang" and from the denizens of the distributed system, Walled City. In short order, Maryalice’s boyfriend Eddie shows up with a member of the Kombinat to reclaim the nanotech device.  This prompts Zona Rosa (who has been viewing events over the net) into making a terrible personal sacrifice to save Chia.  Events rapidly come to a head when Rez and Blackwell arrive.  Laney sees events occurring (and about to occur) in the datastreams and rushes with Lo/Rez’s support crew to the love hotel.  A deal is struck and most of the parties are accommodated.  The ultimate resolution is left open as to whether the Rez/Rei union is made possible with the nanotechnology that they have obtained.

References

External links 
 SF Site Reviews - A review by Leon Olszewski

1996 Canadian novels
Novels by William Gibson
1996 science fiction novels
Cyberpunk novels
Bridge trilogy
Viking Press books
Novels about music